The Roots of Heaven is a 1956 novel by the Lithuanian-born French writer and WW II aviator, Romain Gary (born Roman Kacew). It received the Prix Goncourt for fiction. It was translated into English in 1957.

Synopsis
The book takes place in French Equatorial Africa. Morrel, a crusading environmentalist, labors to preserve elephants from extinction. He is assisted in the task by Minna, a nightclub hostess, and Forsythe, a disgraced British military officer in search of redemption. The story is a metaphor for the quest for salvation for all humanity.

Adaptation
John Huston directed and Darryl Zanuck produced a 1958 Hollywood film of the same title.

See also
 1956 in literature
 20th-century French literature

References

1956 French novels
Novels by Romain Gary
Prix Goncourt winning works
French novels adapted into films
Éditions Gallimard books